The  School of Sagres (Escola de Sagres in Portuguese), also called Court of Sagres is supposed to have been a group of figures associated with fifteenth century Portuguese navigation, gathered by prince Henry of Portugal in Sagres near Cape St. Vincent, the southwestern end of the Iberian Peninsula, in the Algarve.

Since the nearby port of Lagos was the actual point of departure for numerous expeditions of exploration and colonization along the African coast and Atlantic islands, the existence of a "school" at Sagres has been questioned by some historians. After the death of Prince Henry (1460), the center of Portuguese discoveries center shifted to Lisbon.

The first written mention of a "school" at Sagres in English dates from the seventeenth century by Samuel Purchas, although Damião de Gois had already pointed to a similar idea  in the sixteenth century. Portuguese and  English historians settled on the term and it gained popularity.

Scholarly debate

Romantic view 
In 1894, C. R. Beazly published a biography of Prince Henry stating that he had installed his court in Sagres in 1418, shortly after the capture of Ceuta by the Portuguese. There he would have gathered the best of "science and navigation", built a shipyard and a palace with the first observatory in Portugal, even writing that Sagres represented the modern refounding of "the systematic study of applied science" in Christendom. The diverse religious background of the members of the alleged "school" (Jews, Muslims, Christians), and even a remote connection to the Templars, given the fact that Prince Henry was the commander of the Order of Christ, have served to reinforce a romantic view of the matter.

Critical view 
Ever since then, others have nuanced that, rather than a nautical school in the modern sense of the word, Sagres was a meeting place for sailors and scientists to exchange information and techniques regarding maps, shipbuilding and organize expeditions. According to a more critical view, the Portuguese learned navigation in a practical way, on the decks of the ships, and lacking archaeological and documentary support for the supposed "school", consider it a myth of Portuguese history.

Majorcan influence 

The Majorcan school of cartography is known to have influenced Portuguese know-how, since Prince Henry commissioned the Jewish Majorcan Jehuda Cresques to produce portolans for him. According to the 16th century Portuguese navigator Pacheco Pereira:

The 16th century Portuguese chronicler João de Barros on his part states:

Though some wonder if the mestre Jacome mentioned in Portuguese sources corresponded to the same mestre Jacome  from Maiorca, no other person from that era is known to have bore the same name.

First results
João Gonçalves Zarco located Porto Santo in 1419 and Madeira in 1420, while Diogo de Silves found the island of Santa Maria in 1427. In 1434 Gil Eanes rounded Cape Bojador. It had taken twelve years to sail beyond two hundred miles separating the Cape Não from Cape Bojador. Beyond that a point begun the "Dark Sea" feared by Arab geographers, due to the difficulty of sailing back north due to contrary winds. A solution to this problem was eventually achieved in the second quarter of the fifteenth century, by means of high sea sailing, returning by a route far away from the coast, dubbed by the Portuguese as Volta do Mar. This breakthrough was achieved through the use of a suitable vessel, the Caravel, used for fishing and characterized for its robustness and shallowness, with a tonnage from 50 to 160 tonnes, 1, to 3 masts with triangular Latin sails.

See also

 Angelino Dulcert
 Catalan chart
 Majorcan cartographic school
 Memorias históricas (Capmany)
 Història de la Marina Catalana
 Abraham Cresques
 Arte de navegar

References

External links

Rocha, Danie. «Brasil: historiador nega existência da Escola de Sagres»
Portolan charts from S.XIII to S.XVI - Additions, Corrections, Updates

Navigation
Sailing